Ted Alexandro (born January 26, 1969) is a stand-up comedian from New York City. He has appeared on most late night talk shows and has had his own half-hour specials on Comedy Central.

Biography 
Alexandro is a native of Bellerose, Queens, New York, and he attended St. Francis Preparatory School.  At the age of ten, young Ted felt he had a future as an equestrian.  However, his ambitions were thwarted when his uncle gave young Ted his first exposure to horse riding, in which he got thrown in a "scary" ordeal.  The loss of young Ted's promise proved a real blow to the sport; prominent media figure Eddie Pepitone told Ted, "A lot of people thought, you know, you were going to be one of the better equestrian people going." So instead he settled and matriculated to City College of New York, with a major in music with a concentration in jazz piano. His father was a New York City Public School teacher in Brooklyn for 30 years, and his mother worked in the home, raising five kids. She taught high school religion, health and sex education. He later transferred to Queens College, where he obtained a Masters in elementary education. Upon graduating, he taught elementary school music for five years and performed comedy at night. Since then, Alexandro has appeared on the Late Show with David Letterman, Late Night with Conan O'Brien, Jimmy Kimmel Live!, The Late Late Show with Craig Ferguson, Dr. Katz, The Rob and Joe Show  and two half-hour Comedy Central Presents specials. He has also appeared on Oz, Louie and Inside Amy Schumer.

Time Out NY listed Ted as one of 21 New York Comedy Scene Linchpins, "As a comic, Ted Alexandro is a New York fixture as firm as bedrock."

In a career spanning over twenty years he has opened for Chuck Berry, Smokey Robinson, Louis C.K., Lewis Black, Craig Ferguson, Dennis Miller, Joan Rivers, and Jim Gaffigan.

Ted was one of the founders of The New York Comedians Coalition, which raised the pay for comedians in NYC comedy clubs.

He has been very active with the Occupy Wall Street movement  and he is one of the founders of Occupy Astoria Long Island City.

His latest project is the comedy web series Teachers Lounge  which he is independently produced and wrote with his partner and co-star Hollis James, and which featured Lewis Black, Jim Gaffigan, Dave Attell, Judah Friedlander, Jim Norton, Judy Gold, Todd Barry, Rachel Feinstein, Michael Che, and musician Ted Leo as teachers hanging out in the teachers lounge of an elementary school. In 2014, Teachers Lounge won two Cynopsis Digital Media Awards: Best New Comedy Web Series and Jim Gaffigan for Best Guest Appearance in a Comedy Web Series.

References

External links 
Twitter account
Ted Alexandro performs as a part of Radio Happy Hour

1969 births
Living people
American male comedians
People from Queens, New York
St. Francis Preparatory School alumni
Comedians from New York (state)
20th-century American comedians
21st-century American comedians